Gaja Gamini (English: Woman with an elephant's gait.) is a 2000 Indian film written and directed by M. F. Husain and is his ode to womanhood and his muse of the time, Madhuri Dixit, who stars as the lead in the film with Shahrukh Khan and Naseeruddin Shah. The film was a box office disaster.

Plot
The central figure of the film is represented by a mysterious figure called "Gaja Gamini", who inspires, arouses, and confuses the common man. "Gaja Gamini" is the inspiration behind Leonardo da Vinci's 'Mona Lisa', Kalidas' poem "Shakuntala", and a photojournalist named Shahrukh's photographs. The mysterious "Gaja Gamini" appears as four characters, one of them being Sangeeta, a blind girl from Banaras at the beginning of time, who inspires village women to revolt against a male-dominated system and carve a niche for women forever. Another character is Shakuntala, who is the subject of Kalidas' poem of the same name. Shakuntala incites jealousy in the women and love in the men around her, charming humans and animals alike in the forests of Kerala. "Gaja Gamini" is also Mona Lisa during the Renaissance, the object of painter Leonardo da Vinci's obsession. Finally, Monika, the most confusing sector of the film, is supposed to represent the woman of the New Millennium. Kamdev, the God of Love, walks the earth throughout history, attempting to win the love of "Gaja Gamini".

Thrown into this mix is a large black wall, separating two different periods, and confrontations between Science and Art at different points in history, showing that the world itself can change, but its original ideas will always be the same. For example, a play by Shakespeare wrote and performed by actors in the 15th century will still be performed in the 21st century, but with different actors. The confrontations between art and science also bring about the idea that while science is firmly set on believing that which can only be proved, the basis for art is that which can be proved and an intuitive sense that can be felt. Science uses the brain, while Art uses the brain and the heart. Another facet of the film is a "gathri", a small bundle which a woman carries upon her head, like a burden, with which she must walk forever.

Cast
Madhuri Dixit as Gaja Gamini/ Sangeeta/ Shakuntala/ Monika /Mona Lisa
Shabana Azmi as Premchand's Nirmala
Naseeruddin Shah as Leonardo da Vinci
Shahrukh Khan (Guest appearance)
Shilpa Shirodkar as Sindhu
Inder Kumar as Kamdev
Tej Sapru as Tansen
Farida Jalal as Noorbibi
Mohan Agashe as Kalidasa
Ashish Vidyarthi as Scientist
Shahrukh Khan (Cameo)
Kalpana Pandit as Abhisarika
Raisa Husain as Phulvania
 Ali Hassan as Bhola
Rashida Siddiqui as Nawab Begum
Sunita Kumar as Raj Mata
Tanvi Hegde
M.F.Hussain as Painter

Review
Sumnan Tarafdar of Filmfare gave a positive review of the film, calling it "not something that comes along every day". Taran Adarsh said "The film has a very colourful look, with the visuals being eye-catching. But as a director, Hussain fails to convey his thoughts on celluloid. On the whole, Gaja Gamini is an artistic film which will not be understood by any strata of an audience - classes or masses. Business-wise, the film is sure to spell disaster. A waste of precious celluloid."

Soundtrack

Hussain approached A. R. Rahman to compose the music for the film, but due to time constraints, he had to turn down the offer. The music was composed by Bhupen Hazarika.

References

External links

Gaja Gamini at Bollywood Hungama

2000s Hindi-language films
2000 films
Indian fantasy drama films
Films about women in India
Films distributed by Yash Raj Films
2000 fantasy films